A Step into the Darkness is a 1938 Czech criminal-comedy film directed by Martin Frič. The film was dubbed to German and released under the name Schritt ins Dunkel in 1943.

Cast
 Rolf Wanka as Ronny
 Václav Trégl as Valentin
 František Smolík as Jan Haller
 Adina Mandlová as Eva Hallerová
 Zvonimir Rogoz as O.A. Linde
 Alena Frimlová as Linde's lover Magda
 Vítězslav Boček as Fred Baron
 Theodor Pištěk as Filip
 Růžena Šlemrová as Filip's wife
 František Kreuzmann as Josef

References

External links
 

1938 films
1930s crime comedy films
1930s Czech-language films
Czechoslovak black-and-white films
Films directed by Martin Frič
Czechoslovak crime comedy films
Czech crime comedy films
1938 comedy films
1930s Czech films